The National University of Medical Sciences, commonly referred as NUMS, is a public university located in Rawalpindi, Punjab, Pakistan.

Overview
The National University of Medical Sciences is recognized by the Higher Education Commission of Pakistan (HEC) for degree awarding status and accredited by the Pakistan Medical and Dental Council (PMDC) and the College of Physicians and Surgeons of Pakistan (CPSP) for undergraduate and postgraduate medical education and training. It was established in 2015 and run by the Pakistan Army Medical Corps. Previously, Army Medical College (which is a military-run medical institute) was affiliated with National University of Sciences and Technology, Pakistan (NUST) but now it is a constituent college of the university.

Constituent institutions 
 Army Medical College
 Armed Forces Post Graduate Medical Institute
 College of Nursing, Armed Forces Post Graduate Medical Institute
 Army College of Veterinary Sciences

Affiliated institutions 
 CMH Lahore Medical And Dental College
 CMH Kharian Medical College
 Quetta Institute of Medical Sciences
 CMH Multan Institute of Medical Sciences
 Wah Medical College
 HITEC Institute of Medical Sciences, Taxila
 Karachi Institute of Medical Sciences
 CMH Institute of Medical Sciences, Bahawalpur

Teaching/Training Hospitals/Institutes 

 Armed Forces Institute of Cardiology
 Armed Forces Institute of Dentistry
 Armed Forces Institute of Mental Health
 Armed Forces Institute of Ophthalmology
 Armed Forces Institute of Pathology
 Armed Forces Institute of Radiology and Imaging
 Armed Forces Institute of Rehabilitation Medicine
 Armed Forces Institute of Transfusion
 Armed Forces Bone Marrow Transplant Centre
 Armed Forces Institute of Urology

Programs
The disciplines and the degree programs offered by NUMS have been tabulated below.

See also
 List of medical colleges in Pakistan

References

External links
NUMS official website

Pakistan Army universities and colleges
2015 establishments in Pakistan
Medical colleges in Punjab, Pakistan
Universities and colleges in Rawalpindi District
Public universities and colleges in Punjab, Pakistan
Military medicine in Pakistan
Educational institutions established in 2015
Military education and training in Pakistan